Northridge station is a Metrolink passenger train station in the community of Northridge of the northern San Fernando Valley, in Los Angeles. Metrolink's Ventura County Line trains from Los Angeles Union Station to East Ventura stop here.

The station has 290 parking spaces, 8 handicapped spaces, and 2 parking spaces which have electric vehicle charging stations.

A temporary platform opened at the station on February 14, 1994, as part of the emergency expansion of service on the Ventura County Line in response to the 1994 Northridge earthquake. The permanent station opened on July 10, 2000.

References

External links 

Metrolink stations in Los Angeles County, California
Northridge, Los Angeles
Public transportation in the San Fernando Valley
Railway stations in the United States opened in 1994
1994 establishments in California